Timothy Norman Lenardon (born May 11, 1962 in Trail, British Columbia) is a Canadian retired ice hockey centre who played 15 games in the National Hockey League for the New Jersey Devils and Vancouver Canucks between 1986 and 1990. Lenardon spent the rest of his career mainly in the minor American Hockey League and International Hockey League, retiring in 1993. He currently serves on the scouting staff of the Vancouver Canucks.

Playing career
Lenardon played for the Trail Smoke Eaters and played Canadian college hockey at the University of Brandon. Never drafted, he signed as a free agent with the New Jersey Devils after leaving school in 1986. Assigned to the AHL, he proved to be a quality scorer at that level, recording 63 points in 61 games in the 1986–87 campaign, and earned a 7-game NHL callup to New Jersey, where he recorded a goal and an assist.

Despite putting up impressive numbers in the minors, Lenardon never received another NHL shot in two more seasons in the Devils' system, and was dealt to the Vancouver Canucks for Claude Vilgrain at the trade deadline in 1989. Lenardon would get his second NHL stint in the 1989–90 season, appearing in 8 games for the Canucks and scoring a goal.

After being released by Vancouver, Lenardon spent a season playing in Italy before signing with the Minnesota North Stars in 1991. He spent two more seasons playing in the minors in Minnesota's system before retiring in 1993. In 15 career NHL games, he recorded 2 goals and an assist for 3 points.

Post-playing career
Lenardon currently serves as an amateur scout for the Vancouver Canucks.

Career statistics

Regular season and playoffs

External links
 

1962 births
Living people
Canadian ice hockey centres
Sportspeople from Trail, British Columbia
Brandon University alumni
Kalamazoo Wings (1974–2000) players
Milwaukee Admirals (IHL) players
New Jersey Devils players
Undrafted National Hockey League players
Vancouver Canucks players
Vancouver Canucks scouts
Ice hockey people from British Columbia
Maine Mariners players
Utica Devils players
Western International Hockey League players